"Human Is" is a science fiction short story by American writer  Philip K. Dick. It was first published in Startling Stories, Winter 1955. The plot centers on the crisis facing a woman whose cold and emotionally abusive husband returns from a survey mission to the dying planet Rexor IV, changed for the better—his psyche was replaced by a Rexorian, glad to have escaped the confines of its dying planet.

The story was adapted by Jessica Mecklenburg for an episode of the 2017 TV series, Philip K. Dick's Electric Dreams.

External links
"Human Is" at the Internet Archive

Short stories by Philip K. Dick
1955 short stories
Works originally published in Startling Stories
Fiction about body swapping
Extraterrestrial life in popular culture